Ghosn is a surname. Notable people with the surname include:

 Carlos Ghosn (born 1954), Brazilian-born businessman
 Caroline Ghosn (born 1987), American businesswoman
 Fadi Ghosn (born 1979), Lebanese footballer
 Fayez Ghosn (1950–2021), Lebanese politician
 Maguy Bou Ghosn (born 1977), Lebanese actress
 Jad Ghosn (born 1986), Lebanese journalist
 Nicolas Ghosn (1940–2018), Lebanese politician and lawyer
 Tiki Ghosn (born 1977), Lebanese-born American mixed martial artist